Fadhel Abbas Ali Isa Al Sawad is a Bahraini attorney and politician. He was sworn into the Council of Representatives on December 12, 2018, representing the Eighth District of the Capital Governorate.

Career
Al Sawad defended photojournalist Ahmed Humaidan in court from charges of attacking a police station during the Bahraini uprising of 2011, but Humaidan was convicted and sentenced to ten years of imprisonment.

Council of Representatives

In the 2018 Bahraini general election, Al Sawad ran to represent the Eighth District in the Capital Governorate in the Council of Representatives, the nation’s lower house of Parliament. He received 875 votes for 39.83% in the first round on November 24, necessitating a runoff on December 1, in which he defeated his opponent, Mohammed Ashour, with 1,085 votes for 62.94%.

References	

Year of birth missing (living people)
Living people
Members of the Council of Representatives (Bahrain)
Bahraini Shia Muslims
Bahraini lawyers